The University of the Punjab, Jhelum Campus (also referred to as Punjab University, Jhelum campus or PUJC) is a sub campus of University of the Punjab, Lahore located in Jhelum, Punjab Pakistan. It was established in 2012.

Departments

Department of Administrative Sciences
Department of Business Administration
Department of Commerce
Department of Information Technology
Department of Law

References

External links 
 

Jhelum
Public universities and colleges in Punjab, Pakistan
Universities and colleges in Jhelum District